The 2022 California Superintendent of Public Instruction election was held on June 7, 2022 to elect the Superintendent of Public Instruction of California. Unlike most other elections in the state, the office is not elected under the state's nonpartisan blanket primary system. Instead, the officially nonpartisan position is elected via a general election, with a runoff scheduled for November 8, 2022 as no candidate received a majority of the vote.

Incumbent Democratic Superintendent Tony Thurmond easily won re-election to a second term, defeating Lance Christensen by 26 points. He was first elected in 2018 with 50.9% of the vote, narrowly defeating Marshall Tuck in a runoff election.

Candidates

Advanced to runoff 
 Lance Christensen, education policy executive
 Tony Thurmond, incumbent superintendent

Eliminated in primary 
 Marco Amaral, teacher and trustee
 Joseph Guy Campbell, Montessori education publisher
 Jim Gibson, cyber security professional and candidate for mayor of Oceanside in 2016
 Ainye E. Long, public school teacher
 George Yang, software architect and candidate for U.S. Senate in 2016

Endorsements

General election

Results

Runoff

Polling

Results

Notes

References

External links 
Official campaign links
 Lance Christensen for Superintendent
 Tony Thurmond for Superintendent

Superintendent of Public Instruction
California Superintendent of Public Instruction elections
California